Pseudohadena pseudamoena is a moth of the family Noctuidae. It is found in Armenia and Iran.

References

Moths described in 1943
Xyleninae